Didymium is a genus of slime molds in the family Didymiaceae.

Selected species
Didymium difforme
Didymium squamulosum
Didymium wildpretii

References

Myxogastria
Amoebozoa genera
Taxa named by Heinrich Schrader (botanist)